The first season of How I Met Your Mother, an American sitcom created by Carter Bays and Craig Thomas, premiered on CBS in the United States on September 19, 2005, and concluded on May 15, 2006. The season was directed by Pamela Fryman and produced by Bays & Thomas Productions and 20th Century Fox Television. It consists of 22 episodes, each running approximately 22 minutes in length.

The season introduces Ted Mosby (voiced by former Full House actor Bob Saget) in the year 2030 as he sits his daughter and son down to tell them the story of how he met their mother. The story begins in 2005 with Ted (Josh Radnor) as a single, 27-year-old architect living in Manhattan with his two best friends from college: Marshall Eriksen (Jason Segel), a law student, and Lily Aldrin (Alyson Hannigan), a kindergarten teacher, who have been dating for almost nine years when Marshall proposes. Their engagement causes Ted to think about marriage and finding his soul mate, much to the disgust of his self-appointed best friend Barney Stinson (Neil Patrick Harris). Ted begins his search for his perfect mate and meets an ambitious young reporter, Robin Scherbatsky (Cobie Smulders), whom he quickly falls in love with. Robin, however, doesn't want to rush into a relationship and the two decide to be friends. However, Robin begins to develop feelings for Ted while he begins dating a baker, Victoria, but when she moves to Germany for a culinary fellowship, Ted leads Robin to believe that she broke up with him. As a result, Victoria breaks up with Ted and Robin begins to distance herself from him, though they eventually reconcile. As her wedding date approaches, Lily begins to wonder if she's missed any opportunities because of her relationship with Marshall and decides to pursue an art fellowship in San Francisco, breaking her engagement in the process. At the end of the season, Marshall is seen looking desolate and miserable, while Ted and Robin agree to pursue a relationship.

The first season garnered mixed-to-positive reviews. On the review aggregation site, Rotten Tomatoes reported that 63% of 16 critics gave the show a positive review. Despite the mixed reception, the show appeared on several television best lists, including Time magazine and Chicago Tribune. The first season garnered an average of 9.47 million viewers per all 22 episodes in the U.S. Out of all regular primetime programming that aired during the 2005–2006 American television season, How I Met Your Mother ranked 51st out of 156, according to the Nielsen ratings system. The pilot was watched by 10.94 million viewers, while the finale was watched by 8.64 million viewers.

Casting
The first season features a cast of five actors who receive star billing. Josh Radnor portrays Ted, a young architect who is searching for his future wife. Jason Segel and Alyson Hannigan portray Marshall Eriksen and Lily Aldrin, respectively, a newly engaged couple. Cobie Smulders plays Robin Scherbatsky, an ambitious reporter whom Ted falls for. Barney Stinson, Ted's self-appointed best friend and a womanizer, is played by Neil Patrick Harris. Season one also introduced several recurring cast members, including Lyndsy Fonseca and David Henrie as Ted's children, and Ashley Williams as Victoria, Ted's love interest for the second half of the season. The season one pilot episode was recognized by the Casting Society of America with a nomination for the Best Comedy Pilot Casting Artios Award. 

How I Met Your Mother was inspired by creators Carter Bays and Craig Thomas's idea to "write about our friends and the stupid stuff we did in New York", where they previously worked as writers for Late Show with David Letterman. The two drew from their friendship in creating the characters. Ted is based loosely on Bays, and Marshall and Lily are based loosely on Thomas and his wife. Thomas's wife Rebecca was initially reluctant to have a character based on her, but agreed if they could get Hannigan to play her. Radnor and Segel were relative unknowns, but Smulders, another relatively little-known actress, was cast as Robin after  Jennifer Love Hewitt turned down the role in favor of Ghost Whisperer. Bays and Thomas commented on her casting by saying, "thank God we did for a million reasons ... when Ted's seeing her for the first time, America's seeing her for the first time — the intriguingness of that propelled the show going forward and kept the show alive".

The role of Barney was initially envisioned as a "John Belushi-type character" before Neil Patrick Harris won the role after being invited to an audition by the show's casting director Megan Branman. Harris's character was widely reported to be the breakout character, with Variety calling him "the major breakout" and Boston.com noting that his character was the "most buzzed about element of the show". Robert Bianco from USA Today observed that Harris "sparkled" in his role, and further praised Hannigan's performance as equally "delightful" as her role in Buffy the Vampire Slayer.

Main cast
 Josh Radnor as Ted Mosby
 Jason Segel as Marshall Eriksen
 Cobie Smulders as Robin Scherbatsky
 Neil Patrick Harris as Barney Stinson
 Alyson Hannigan as Lily Aldrin
 Bob Saget (uncredited) as Future Ted Mosby (voice only)

Recurring cast
 Lyndsy Fonseca as Penny (future daughter) 
 David Henrie as Luke (future son)
 Ashley Williams as Victoria 
 Joe Nieves as Carl 
 Alexis Denisof as Sandy Rivers
 Marshall Manesh as Ranjit 
 Charlene Amoia as Wendy the Waitress

Guest cast
Virginia Williams as Claudia
Kelly Stables as Masseuse
Amy Acker as Penelope

Release

Critical reception
Season one of How I Met Your Mother received mixed reviews from television critics. Metacritic, a review aggregation site that collects critical opinions, gave the first season a score of 69 out of 25 reviews collected, signifying "generally favorable reviews". Many critics compared the show to the recently concluded sitcom Friends, with some calling it a "worthy successor" and others a "well-executed ... rip-off". Including it on his annual "Best of Television" list, James Poniewozik of Time observed that "just a few episodes into the show's run, the writers know these characters inside and out". However, Poniewozik derided the premise of the show, Future Ted's narration, as a "gimmicky distraction". Hal Boedeker of The Orlando Sentinel disagreed, saying that "the twist should keep viewers coming back" and praises the five leads as "irresistible". The A.V. Club also called the premise "a winner" and the actors "appealing", but complained that the show stuck too closely to standard sitcom one-liners, as did Doug Elfman of the Chicago Sun-Times, who disparaged the script as little more than a series of "cheap jokes".

Robert Bianco from USA Today was more upbeat, praising the "fine cast" and "humorous script", and calling the show the "most inventive" of new series that year. The New York Times said that the show was "pleasant to watch" has "potential to improve", but will not "revolutionize" sitcoms or start a pop culture phenomenon. Charlie McCollum of The San Jose Mercury News writes that How I Met Your Mother was a prime candidate for replacing Friends in the sitcom category, praising the show as "something with real wit and considerable charm". He praised the writers for "giving a fresh spin to bits and pieces of the sitcom formula" and the cast for "hitting on all cylinders from the very first scene", predicting that the show could be an unexpected creative breakout with audiences.

Awards
The first season was nominated for four awards, winning two. Both wins were from the 58th Primetime Emmy Awards, where the show won the Outstanding Art Direction for a Multi-Camera Series and the Outstanding Cinematography for a Multi-Camera Series categories. In addition, the show was nominated for the People's Choice Awards for Favorite New Television Comedy and was recognized by the Casting Society of America for Best Comedy Pilot Casting.

Distribution
CBS premiered the show in the United States on September 19, 2005. Internationally, the show premiered in the United Kingdom on BBC Two on May 7, 2006, and is aired by Citytv in Canada and Seven Network in Australia. Season one also runs in syndication in the United States.

The first season was released on DVD in the U.S. under the name How I Met Your Mother Season One with the tagline "A Love Story in Reverse" on November 21, 2006, as a three-disc box set. The DVD cropped the original widescreen broadcast to a full frame 4:3 format, and no widescreen format has been released. The set was released in Region 2 on May 7, 2007, and Region 4 on January 10, 2007. Every episode in this season is available for purchase from the U.S. iTunes store.

Episodes

References

1
2005 American television seasons
2006 American television seasons